WarGames is a specialized steel cage match in professional wrestling. The match usually involves two teams of either four, five, or more wrestlers locked inside a steel cage that encompasses two rings placed side by side. The cage may or may not have a roof, depending on which professional wrestling promotion the match is held in. 

Created by Dusty Rhodes in 1987, the WarGames match was originally used in Jim Crockett Promotions (JCP) of the National Wrestling Alliance, and later, held annually in World Championship Wrestling (WCW), usually at the Fall Brawl pay-per-view event—in 1988, JCP was sold and rebranded as WCW. These original WarGames matches had a roof on the cage with no pinfalls as a win situation, although later WCW versions allowed pinfalls to win. Since 2017, WWE, which purchased the assets of WCW in 2001, has held annual WarGames matches at WarGames branded events. WWE's WarGames matches do not have a roof on the cage and also allow pinfalls as a win situation. 

Over the years, other promotions have held their own versions of WarGames matches under different names, most notably, All Elite Wrestling (AEW). The company established its own version of the match called Blood and Guts, which was first held in 2021. AEW's version is based on the original JCP version with a roof on the cage and no pinfalls. AEW holds the match annually at its Blood and Guts branded event.

History
The WarGames match was created when Dusty Rhodes was inspired by a viewing of Mad Max Beyond Thunderdome. It was originally used as a specialty match for the Four Horsemen. The first WarGames match took place at The Omni in Atlanta, Georgia during the National Wrestling Alliance's (NWA) Jim Crockett Promotions' (JCP) Great American Bash '87 tour, where it was known as War Games: The Match Beyond. It would be held at three house shows later that year, once at the Miami Orange Bowl, once in Chicago at the UIC Pavilion, and the other at the NWA's debut at The Nassau Coliseum on Long Island. In 1988, JCP was sold to Turner Broadcasting and rebranded as World Championship Wrestling (WCW), although with WCW still under the NWA. That year, it would be held during the Great American Bash Tour in 1988 at 11 house shows (one was released on the WWE Horsemen DVD). The final War Games matches under the NWA/WCW banner were at The Great American Bash in 1989 and a house show rematch at The Omni in Atlanta. WCW, no longer under the NWA, then first used the match in 1991 at WrestleWar and at five house shows during the 1991 Great American Bash tour and in 1992 at WrestleWar, before it became a traditional Fall Brawl event from 1993 to 1998.

In 2001, the World Wrestling Federation (WWF, renamed to WWE in 2002) purchased WCW and its assets, including the rights to the WarGames name. However, WWE would not use the match concept until 2017, when the promotion revived the match to be held for their developmental brand NXT at an event titled NXT TakeOver: WarGames. This would become an annual NXT TakeOver event for WWE until 2021. That year, the TakeOver series was discontinued, but a WarGames event was still held for NXT in December. The following year, WWE rebranded its annual Survivor Series pay-per-view for the main roster brands, Raw and SmackDown, as Survivor Series WarGames, marking WWE's first main roster event to feature the match.

Format
The WarGames match consists of two or three teams, with between three and five participants facing off with each other in staggered entry format.

The setup of the cage consists of two rings side by side with a ring-encompassing rectangular cage that covered both rings, but not the ringside area. Doors are placed at far corners of the cage, near where the opposing teams wait to enter, so the teams do not contact each other before they enter the match.

The match begins with one member of each team entering the cage. After five minutes, a member from one of the teams (usually determined by a coin toss, and almost always the "heel" team in order to provide heat) would enter the cage, giving his team the temporary 2-on-1 handicap advantage. After two minutes, a member from the other team would enter to even the odds for the next 2 minutes. Entrants alternate between teams every two minutes, giving the coin toss-winning team the temporary advantage in terms of numbers, before giving the other team the advantage with the freshest man and even odds.

Teams continue to alternate during the two-minute periods until all participants are in the ring.

Once all participants enter the cage, what is referred to as "The Match Beyond" begins. Both teams wrestle each other in the cage until any participant either submits, surrenders, or is knocked unconscious. There originally were no pinfalls, no count-outs, and no disqualifications. However, later WCW versions began to allow pinfalls.

In WWE and Major League Wrestling's variations, the cage is roofless and pinfalls are allowed. However, in WWE's variation, if one member of a team escapes the cage, their whole team is disqualified. In a 2022 interview with The Ringer, Triple H explained the removal of the cage's roof. Triple H said: 

On the October 31, 2019, episode of WWE NXT, the first-ever women's WarGames match was announced for that year's NXT TakeOver: WarGames event. Women Superstars Uncensored and Pro-Wrestling: EVE have previously held variations of the WarGames match, but this would be the first official match to follow the WarGames format.

NWA/WCW/WWE Match history

Participant list 
WWE

Males

Females 

NWA

WCW

WCW WarGames variations

1998
In 1998, WCW decided to try something different and converted WarGames into a 3-team, 9-man competition (with the same cage and entry format, but they allowed pinfalls) for the #1 Contendership to the WCW World Heavyweight Title.

Team WCW consisted of: Diamond Dallas Page, Roddy Piper, The Warrior
Team Hollywood consisted of: Hollywood Hogan, Stevie Ray, Bret Hart
Team Wolfpac consisted of: Kevin Nash, Sting, Lex Luger

Hogan entered the cage early, by force, so he and Stevie Ray could take out all the other participants, including their teammate Bret Hart. When Hogan went to pin Kevin Nash, smoke engulfed the ring and it appeared that The Warrior had magically entered the cage. Hogan and Stevie Ray beat him down, but more smoke appeared, and when it cleared away The Warrior was gone leaving Hogan holding his coat. The real Warrior then ran out from the back to enter the match. Hogan would eventually force his way out of the cage door, with Warrior following suit by climbing up the cage wall and kicking it in.

Davey Boy Smith suffered a near career ending back injury earlier that night after he fell on the trap door WCW used for this stunt.  He became dependent on painkillers during his rehabilitation from this injury which would ultimately contribute to his early death. Perry Saturn was also injured from the trap door, but not as severely.

Page won the match by scoring the Diamond Cutter on Stevie Ray for the pinfall victory. He went on to Halloween Havoc to face Goldberg for the title, only to lose after being hit with a spear and Jackhammer.

2000
After the WarGames match was not held in 1999, Vince Russo brought back WarGames in a new format he called "WarGames 2000", with the tagline "Russo's Revenge". It was held on the September 4, 2000 episode of WCW Nitro. The match consisted of two teams vying for the WCW World Heavyweight Championship in a three-tiered cage first seen in the climax of the WCW produced film Ready to Rumble and later used at Slamboree in May 2000. The rules combined the traditional WarGames entry formats with the rules of the Triple Cage match at Slamboree, which required the competitors to scale the cages in order to retrieve the belt. There were two differences between the matches, however. Instead of the belt hanging above the roof of the third cage, it was instead placed inside said cage. Second, in order to win the match, someone had to escape from the bottom cage with the belt; this meant that a wrestler had to climb up through both cages, open the third cage to get the belt, and then climb back down and leave the cage all while avoiding the other participants who could steal the belt from him and take it for themselves without ever having to leave the bottom cage.

The match pitted Sting, Booker T, Goldberg, and KroniK (Brian Adams and Bryan Clark) against Russo's hand-picked team: WCW World Champion Kevin Nash, Jeff Jarrett, Scott Steiner, and The Harris Brothers (Don and Ron).

The match had been scheduled as a four-on-four match, with Sting, Booker T, Goldberg and Ernest Miller against Nash, Jarrett, Steiner and Russo. Earlier in the night, each man from the first team was forced to wrestle a qualifying match to compete: Sting beat both Vampiro and The Great Muta in a handicap match, Goldberg defeated Shane Douglas, and Booker T had to defeat his brother Stevie Ray. However, Miller lost to KroniK in a handicap match, making it five-on-four. Thus, when it was his turn to enter, Russo sent the Harris Brothers instead, making it 6 on 5.

During the match, Nash teased a betrayal: when he entered the first cage, he chokeslammed Sting then grabbed Steiner, Jarrett and Russo by the throats. However, as Russo was later walking to the door, Nash grabbed and hugged him.

The Harris Brothers and KroniK drove each other out of the arena. Booker T retrieved the belt from the top, but Russo interfered on behalf of his team. Ernest Miller entered the ring but was Jackknife Powerbombed by Nash. Steiner and Jarrett handcuffed Sting and Booker to the walls of the second cage. Goldberg broke free of the handcuffs which held him to the turnbuckle of the ring and attempted to leave the cage with the belt, but was cut off by Bret Hart, who slammed the cage door in his face. Nash then retrieved the title belt and walked out the cage door, retaining the title.

Spin-off matches

All Elite Wrestling
All Elite Wrestling (AEW) announced during Revolution that it would debut the "Blood and Guts" match on March 25, 2020 during a special episode of its weekly series Dynamite (billed as Blood and Guts). The Blood and Guts match is based largely on the original Crockett-era WarGames rules, with a win condition of submission or surrender (no pinfalls, countouts, or escaping the cage) except with no win condition when a wrestler is knocked unconscious. The inaugural match was announced to be The Elite (Adam Page, Cody Rhodes, Kenny Omega, and Matt and Nick Jackson) vs. The Inner Circle (Chris Jericho, Jake Hager, Sammy Guevara, Santana and Ortiz). Nick Jackson was attacked by The Inner Circle, leaving him out indefinitely. The Inner Circle (Jake Hager, Santana and Ortiz) defeated The Elite (Adam Page, Cody, Matt Jackson) on the March 18 episode of Dynamite, giving them the entry advantage. After the match with The Elite seemingly expected to be outnumbered 5-on-4 going into the event, Matt Jackson revealed the debuting Matt Hardy as their fifth member. Due to the COVID-19 pandemic, the event was postponed.

The concept returned as during April 2021 episodes, Jericho announced that Inner Circle will participate in the WarGames style match against The Pinnacle (MJF, Wardlow, Shawn Spears, FTR) scheduled on the May 5, 2021 episode of Dynamite. This match, which was also AEW's first ever "Blood and Guts" match, took place on the scheduled date at AEW Blood and Guts. The second annual Blood and Guts match would take place on the June 29, 2022 episode of Dynamite and featured Blackpool Combat Club (Jon Moxley, Claudio Castagnoli, & Wheeler Yuta), Eddie Kingston, Santana & Ortiz vs Jericho Appreciation Society (Chris Jericho, Sammy Guevara, Jake Hager, Daniel Garcia, Matt Menard, & Angelo Parker) (w/ Tay Conti).

Combat Zone Wrestling
Combat Zone Wrestling has used WarGames stipulations the some of their Cage of Death events, the most recent being in Cage Of Death XV (2013). For Cage of Death 5, in that there were two rings; one of them was surrounded by the cage, and the other was filled with "one million" thumbtacks (the actual amount has never been verified). Above the two rings was scaffolding walkway on which the wrestlers could walk on at any time. The match started with two members of each team, and every 90 seconds a wrestler, from either team, entered the match according to the number they drew before the match started. These eliminations which will occurred in that would happen when a wrestler would hit the arena floor; however, Cage of Death 5 also had rules that the wrestlers who were not tossed out of or off the cage, that they could travel a scaffold hanging above another ring filled with thumbtacks to safety, scoring points for the team. For Cage of Death 6 there were eliminations that would happen when a wrestler would hit the arena floor much like Cage of Death 5 the year before, the difference being that the tag team titles were hanging on a scaffold stretched across the length of the top of the cage overlooking the two rings, plus all weapons littered around double caged ring.

Cage of Death 7 just had standard pinfall and submissions after all combatants entered the cage. For 2008's Cage of Death, the large eight-sided cage that surrounds the entire ringside area with a barbwire spidernet setup on one side and glass setup on another side with tables underneath and two scaffold platforms across the ring from each other. All different Hardcore and deathmatch wrestling weapons such as thumbtack turnbuckles, barbed wire bats, staple guns, light tubes, barbed wire, baseball bats, thumbtacks, panes of glass, and all others littered around it for wrestlers to use. The WarGames rules returned with pinfalls and submissions that could be done throughout the match after all combatants of either team entered the cage.

Extreme Championship Wrestling
Extreme Championship Wrestling (ECW) held a version of WarGames known as an "Ultimate Jeopardy steel cage match"; the match is conducted in a similar manner to WarGames, with victory by submission, pinfall, knockout, or surrender, but with weapons provided, and stipulation penalties for the losing team.

The first Ultimate Jeopardy match was held at Ultimate Jeopardy 1994, between Shane Douglas, Mr. Hughes and The Public Enemy, and a team of Terry Funk, Road Warrior Hawk, Kevin Sullivan and The Tazmaniac for the ECW World Heavyweight Championship.

IWA Mid-South
Independent Wrestling Association Mid-South presented "No Blood, No Guts, No Glory 2005" at the National Guard Armory in Valparaiso, Indiana on Saturday night, July 2, 2005. The match pitted "Team Ian" Ian Rotten, Axl Rotten, Chris Hero, Corporal Robinson and Bull Pain against "Team Fannin" B. J. Whitmer, Eddie Kingston, Mark Wolf, J. C. Bailey, and Steve Stone and "Team NWA" Eric Priest, Chandler McClure, Tank and Sal and Vito Thomaselli in a double-ring, double-cage, three-team War Games match, with the winning team taking full control of the IWA-MS. The match was won when JC Bailey caused his own team to be outnumbered, allowing Ian Rotten's Team IWA to capitalize and win the match.

Major League Wrestling
On September 19, 2003 at the War Games TV Taping held at the Fort Lauderdale, FL War Memorial Auditorium, the Funkin' Army (Terry Funk, The Sandman, Steve Williams, Sabu, and Bill Alfonso) defeated The Extreme Horsemen (Steve Corino, Simon Diamond, C. W. Anderson, PJ Walker, and Barry Windham) when Funk made Corino submit following a fireball to Corino's face.

In 2018, MLW would return to Fort Lauderdale for a second "War Games" event, which was taped for a special episode of MLW Fusion on BeIN Sports.

Pro Wrestling Unplugged
Pro Wrestling Unplugged (PWU) had held a match called "Cuffed and Caged" match on January 20, 2007. It is somewhat similar to a Lethal Lockdown match in TNA, but with a few small differences.

Two teams of five wrestlers take part in this match. Starts with one member of each team, with one new member added to the match at certain time intervals until all ten are in.

The main differences between this match and a Lethal Lockdown and WarGames match, is that in this match wrestlers are eliminated by pin or submit in the cage or getting handcuffed to the outside of the cage. The winner is the one man or team left standing after all members of opposing team are eliminated.

Pro-Wrestling:EVE
Pro-Wrestling: EVE presented the second ever all female War Games match. It had a steel cage surrounding only the one ring, but all other rules were the same as the original concept. It was the opening contest as part of the first WrestleQueendom event in the iconic York Hall, in Bethnal Green, London on Saturday 5 May 2018. The teams of "Squad Goals" consisting of Rhia O’Reily, Laura Di Matteo, Addy Starr and Emi Sakura and "The Deserving" made up of Jamie Hayter, Charli Evans, Jayla Dark and Blue Nikita competed in the bout. Highlights include a brawl outside the cage before the match started, O'Reilly entering the cage last and diving onto all the competitors and Squad Goals locking in a submission on each member of The Deserving to win the match.

Ring of Honor
In December 2005, Ring of Honor held the first Steel Cage Warfare match. It was used to settle the year-long feud between Generation Next and their former leader Alex Shelley, who was now with The Embassy. The match consisted of only one ring but followed the War Games match in that two wrestlers from each team started the match, and after five minutes another wrestler would enter, then every two minutes after another wrestler would enter. The main difference, however, is that the match was an elimination match contested by teams of three, four, or more. Wrestlers can be eliminated at any point by either pin fall or submission.

In July 2006, Ring of Honor held another War Games style match to settle their feud with Combat Zone Wrestling. ROH challenged them to a Steel Cage Warfare match, but CZW said they would only compete if it were their Cage of Death match. This match that could be contested under WarGames rules so the match can only end when all members of both teams have entered the cage. The cage itself is a yellow-steel wired and eight-sided, and surrounds the entire ringside area. All sorts of weapons surround between the ring and the cage walls. The match starts 2 men for 5 minutes, then having a coin flip to see what team would have the advantage with a new man entering every two minutes.

In September 2008, Ring of Honor held a three 'team' Steel Cage Warfare match. This pitted the team of The Briscoe Brothers and Austin Aries, against the team of The Age of the Fall represented by Delirious, Jimmy Jacobs and Tyler Black, against Necro Butcher who fought alone with no partners. The match was held under the same rules, stating Butcher although alone could be drawn and enter the match at any time regardless of a man advantage held by the other teams.

In June 2013, another Steel Cage Warfare match was held, pitting an ROH team of B. J. Whitmer, Michael Elgin, Jay Lethal and Kevin Steen against the S.C.U.M. team of Jimmy Jacobs, Rhino, Cliff Compton and Rhett Titus, where if the ROH team wins, S.C.U.M. must disband, but if the S.C.U.M. team wins, Steve Corino replaces Nigel McGuinness as match maker. Team ROH won the match on a taped episode of Ring of Honor Wrestling television.

Tennessee

Smoky Mountain Wrestling (Knoxville)
The Knoxville, Tennessee-based Smoky Mountain Wrestling (SMW) had their own variation of the WarGames match, called Rage in a Cage. In Rage in a Cage, the ring was surrounded by a cage made of the wooden frameworks and regular fence wires. The match began with one member of each team entering the cage. After five minutes, a member from one of the teams (usually determined by a coin toss) would enter the cage, giving his team the temporary handicap advantage. After two minutes, a member from the other team would enter to even the odds. Once all eight or ten men (depending on team size) had entered the cage, the match begins. The object of the match was to eliminate one-by-one by submitting or handcuffing all members of the opposing team to and in the cage. The first Rage in a Cage match was held at the Civic Coliseum in Knoxville on May 9, 1993, with The Rock n' Roll Express (Ricky Morton and Robert Gibson), The Stud Stable (Robert Fuller and Jimmy Golden), and Brian Lee defeating The Heavenly Bodies (Tom Prichard and Stan Lane), Killer Kyle, Kevin Sullivan, and The Tazmaniac.

United States Wrestling Association (Memphis)
In the summer of 1995, a inter-promotional feud between Smoky Mountain Wrestling and the Memphis, Tennessee-based United States Wrestling Association saw the match move across the state. On August 7, 1995, the Rage in a Cage match was held at the Mid-South Coliseum in Memphis, which saw Team USWA (Bill Dundee, Billy Jack Haynes, Tommy Rich, Doug Gilbert, Brian Lee, Steven Dunn, & PG-13 (J. C. Ice and Wolfie D)) defeat Team SMW (Tracy Smothers, Robert Gibson, Brad Armstrong, Buddy Landell, The Heavenly Bodies (Tom Prichard and Jimmy Del Ray), Terry Gordy, Pat Tanaka & D-Lo Brown).

Impact Wrestling
Impact Wrestling, then known as NWA: Total Nonstop Action, had their own variation of the WarGames match known as the "Wednesday Bloody Wednesday" Steel Cage match. The single ring was surrounded by a large single steel cage with poles attached to the ring posts measured about five to six feet above the turnbuckles, with single chains wrapped from and hanging on the poles to various points on the ring itself with many weapons hanging from and attached to steel chains above itself but followed the rules of War Games match in that two wrestlers from both teams started the match, and after ninety seconds another wrestler would enter. The only way to win is by pinfall or submission. The first and only "Wednesday Bloody Wednesday" Steel Cage match was contested on September 3, 2003 between a team of AJ Styles, Shane Douglas, Christopher Daniels, Simon Diamond and Johnny Swinger and a team of Jeff Jarrett, Raven, D'Lo Brown, Chris Harris and James Storm.

Later, Impact would introduce the Lethal Lockdown match for their annual Lockdown pay-per-view. The only differences are that one ring enclosed by a steel cage with two teams facing off with each other. The staggered entry system is identical, but weapons are permitted and are even provided. The match begins with two wrestlers who must fight for 5 minutes; after that, a member from one of the teams (usually determined by a coin toss) would enter the cage, giving his team the temporary handicap advantage. After two minutes, a member from the other team would enter to even the odds. Entrants alternated between teams every two minutes, giving the coin toss-winning team the temporary advantage in the numbers game before giving the other team the advantage with the freshest man and even odds. When all competitors have entered the ring, a roof is lowered onto the top of the cage, with various weapons hanging from it. Victory can be attained by pinfall or submission.

Another variant in Impact Wrestling is the Hardcore War match, which is in a single ring and is not a cage match but otherwise resembles WarGames. Two teams face off and there are staggered entries for each, and the match being unable to finish until all competitors have entered. The match ends via pinfall or submission in the ring.

United Wrestling Federation
On September 21, 2007 United Wrestling Federation held a WarGame match in Richmond Va. Team Sgt. Slaughter (Rick and Scott Steiner; Dustin Rhodes and Kirby and TJ Mack) def. Team JBL (Homicide and Hernandez; Steve Corino; CW Anderson and Elix Skipper) in a double ring double cage WarGames match, dubbed as and entitled "Uncivil War", when Scott Steiner submitted Corino with the Steiner Recliner as Slaughter simultaneously submitted JBL with the cobra clutch.

Women Superstars Uncensored
Women Superstars Uncensored presented the first ever War Games match with female wrestlers on November 19, 2011 as part of their Breaking Barriers II iPPV. The match featured two trios - Team WSU of Mercedes Martinez, Alicia and Brittney Savage, and the Midwest Militia of Jessicka Havok, Allysin Kay and Sassy Stephie. The match was contested in a steel cage surrounding only one ring, but all other rules were the same as the original concept. The Midwest Militia won the match when Havok threatened to murder an injured Martinez with a machete, and Savage surrendered on Martinez's behalf.

World Wrestling Entertainment

In June 2013, WWE released a DVD anthology set, War Games: WCW's Most Notorious Matches.

During the November 2017 tapings for WWE NXT, it was announced that at NXT TakeOver: Houston, the main event would be a WarGames match. The event was subsequently renamed to NXT TakeOver: WarGames. This would be the first official WarGames match in nearly 20 years. The match was quite different from standard WarGames- including the cage having no roof (although escaping the cage forfeited the match for that person's team), pinfalls were allowed and all remaining members of a team entered at the same time. The match involved three teams, with The Undisputed Era defeating Sanity and Roderick Strong/The Authors of Pain.

NXT TakeOver events preceding WWE's Survivor Series pay-per-view have since continued to be headlined by WarGames, with NXT TakeOver: WarGames (2019) featuring two WarGames matches, one of which was WWE's first-ever women's WarGames match.

In 2022, WWE moved the WarGames from NXT onto their main roster with both Men's & Women's matches taking place at Survivor Series (2022). The Women's match featured Team Belair (Bianca Belair, Alexa Bliss, Asuka, Mia Yim, and Becky Lynch) defeating Team Bayley (Damage CTRL (Bayley, Dakota Kai, and Iyo Sky), Nikki Cross, and Rhea Ripley). The main event consisted of The Bloodline (Roman Reigns, Sami Zayn, Solo Sikoa, and The Usos (Jey Uso and Jimmy Uso)) (with Paul Heyman) defeating The Brawling Brutes (Sheamus, Ridge Holland, and Butch), Drew McIntyre, and Kevin Owens.

Xtreme Pro Wrestling
Rob Black's Xtreme Pro Wrestling promotion also capitalized on the popularity of the WarGames match by holding one of their own, called "Genocide", with the same rules.  However, in the XPW version of the WarGames match, an 18-feet-high steel cage that encompassed two rings with weapons are in two rings but the three-sided cage top that covers over, around and on the top of only one of the two rings, which surrounded by large steel cage, permitting wrestlers to (hypothetically) brawl each other at a top the cage and do table spots off the top of the cage, plus all weapons permitted and provided; the cage, however, was extremely poorly constructed, and started to fall apart during the match, preventing most of the promised action.

References

Professional wrestling match types
World Championship Wrestling
WWE NXT
WWE match types